George Ashbury Johnson (July 27, 1829 – September 20, 1894) was California Attorney General. Prior to that, he was Member of California State Assembly 1st District (1863) and served on the State Senate, 1883–87. He is famous for litigating against the railroad companies and forcing them to pay taxes.

References

External links
Brief biography with picture
Join California George A. Johnson

1829 births
1894 deaths
California Attorneys General
Democratic Party California state senators
19th-century American politicians
Democratic Party members of the California State Assembly